Adella Brown Bailey (1860-1937) was an American politician and suffragist.

Life
Bailey née Brown was born on February 8, 1860  in Aurora, New York. In 1880 she married Dewey C. Bailey with whom she had one child.

Brown's husband, Dewey, was the mayor of Denver, Colorado from 1919 through 1923. Along with her husband, Adella was involved in political life in Denver, active in the Republican Party and serving in 1920 as an alternate delegate from Colorado to the Republican National Convention.

Brown was clubwoman. She was a member of the Women's Club of Denver (WCD), serving as president for four terms. She was also involved with the Equal Suffrage Association.

Nichol died in 1937.

See also
 List of suffragists and suffragettes

References

External links

1860 births 
1937 deaths
Women in Colorado politics
American suffragists